The 1987–88 Marshall Thundering Herd men's basketball team represented Marshall University during the 1987–88 NCAA Division I men's basketball season. The Thundering Herd, led by fifth-year head coach Rick Huckabay, played their home games at the Cam Henderson Center as members of the Southern Conference. They finished the season 24–8, 14–2 in SoCon play to finish in first place. In the SoCon tournament, they were defeated by Chattanooga in the semifinals. As a regular season conference champion who failed to win their conference tournament, the Thundering Herd received an automatic bid to the National Invitation Tournament, where they lost in the first round to VCU.

Roster

Schedule and results

|-
!colspan=8| Regular season
|-

|-
!colspan=8| SoCon tournament

|-
!colspan=8| NIT

References

Marshall Thundering Herd men's basketball seasons
Marshall
Marshall
Marshall Thundering Herd basketball (men's)
Marshall Thundering Herd basketball (men's)